HMS Alamein (D17) was a Later or 1943  fleet destroyer of the British Royal Navy. She was named in honour of the Battle of El Alamein, which took place in 1942 during the Second World War, between Commonwealth forces and the German Afrika Korps.

Alamein was built by R. & W. Hawthorn, Leslie & Company Limited on the Tyne. She was launched on 12 May 1945 and commissioned on 20 March 1946.

Service
In 1946, Alamein joined the 4th Destroyer Flotilla, part of the Home Fleet. In 1948, Alamein, along with her sister-ship , escorted the aircraft carrier   for exercises in Northern and Home waters, though she did not join the two on their subsequent visit to Northern Ireland.

The group visited the Mediterranean, including stops at Italy, and performed a number of naval exercises and fly-the-flag visits in the region. That same year, Alamein decommissioned, being placed in Reserve.

In May 1956, Alamein, as part of the 4th Destroyer Squadron once more after replacing her sister ship , had spells with the Home and Mediterranean Fleets, taking part in the Suez Crisis.

On 5 November 1958, in Chatham Dockyard, a fire occurred onboard Alamein. which was eventually traced to faulty wiring on radio equipment in the Wardroom, which spread to the Ops Room. Fire Parties from Alamein, HMS Corruna, whom she was alongside, plus Chatham & Gillingham fire brigades fought the blaze.

In 1959, Alamein was decommissioned and placed in Reserve for the final time, being broken up at Blyth in Northumberland in 1964.

References

Publications

 

Battle-class destroyers of the Royal Navy
Ships built on the River Tyne
1945 ships
Cold War destroyers of the United Kingdom